The Romance of Helen Trent is the only studio album from the metalcore band The Killing Tree. It was first released in limited editions on June 22, 2002 during an album release show before being formally released by One Day Savior Recordings on June 25, 2002. The album was recorded by Matt Allison at Atlas Studios, Chicago, Illinois over the course of one week.

Recording
Looking back on the recording process, Geoff Rue said that “after a demo ep (Bury Me At Make-Out Creek), we re-entered the old Atlas Studios, which has since become a Korean taco place, and recorded the LP in just over a weeks time, all in evening and late night sessions since the studio shared walls with a few businesses, so we couldn’t really get going until they closed for the day. Matt Allison was good natured about our manic pace to pound out the record as fast as possible (we couldn’t afford much studio time), yet also patient when we insisted on numerous layers of the clap track that begins “The Perfect”.

Copyright issues
A contract was never signed between the record company and the band, so  it is unknown who legally possesses the copyrights of The Romance of Helen Trent; which is thought to be the main reason behind the album's lack of a reissue.

However, despite not being currently available on streaming services or on CD, the album has seen a limited edition rerelease on vinyl for the first time on November 23, 2018 via Think Fast! Records.

Helena Marie
Multiple songs on the album feature intros consisting of a woman speaking about recent things she has been through.  The samples are from an audio diary found in a garbage bag of a girl known only as "Helena Marie". Tim McIlrath has said of the tapes "None of us expected the messages in Helena Marie's audio diary to parallel The Killing Tree message so closely. And when it did, we knew it was just meant to be. It still gives me chills sometimes."

In August 2018, Reu stated in the liner notes for vinyl reissue of the album, “Tim’s roommate at the time, the brilliance and enigmatic Davy Rothbart, who was starting up Found Magazine, had given us a tape of recorded diary-style therapeutic confessions that he had found during his scavenging for abandoned personal artifacts. The voice on the tape identified herself as Helena Murray, and she was at turns vulnerable, self-hating, naïve, regretful, optimistic, emotionally raw, and crushingly honest about her life, relationships, and the inner world. We connected with her voice immediately - she was a kindred spirit - and it felt like it was the spoken word companion to everything we were trying to channel into the songs we had written for the record both thematically and musically, so we wove a few excerpts from the tape throughout the record and name the project after an old radio soap opera, which was similar in name and the protagonist’s brave honesty in searching for love and self in the face of the crushing disappointment life has to offer.”

Limited edition
A limited edition version of the album was planned to be sold at the Fireside Bowl, Chicago, at the album release show on June 22, 2002. Due to problems during the pressing of the album, The Killing Tree had to 'pool their resources' in order to make 100 copies available at the show. These 100 limited copies were sold out at the release show. The 200 delayed copies soon arrived, and featured the same album artwork, but a slightly different insert and disk design as the previous limited edition CD. These editions of the album were mastered by Alan Douches. These copies were sold at live shows exclusively with standard edition being released on June 25, 2002.

Reception

Aversionline.com gave the album 6 out of 10 stars:
 
"Here's some fairly diverse metalcore with both some of the melodic Swedish death metal thing and the chaotic/technical angle happening, as well as some more straightforward metalcore with a blend of chugging hardcore rhythms and a little bit of melody. The vocals are straight screams with the occasional sort of "singing shout" style, which sounds pretty cool here, because it's literally a "singing shout"... if that makes any sense at all? This is definitely better than average, because the transitions are fluid and the songs, while long, tend to carry themselves well. Take for instance the lengthy instrumental, "Soundtrack to a Failing Relationship", starting very calmly with lush clean guitars under heavy delay and eventually leading in to forceful distorted chord progressions with a plodding rhythm section and sparse lead lines. The recording isn't half bad. It's a little bit on the abrasive side, but barely, because the bass tone is thick as hell and the percussion sounds totally natural (two thumbs up there). There's a nice amount of clarity, but I think I'd drop the vocals back a smidge and maybe add some crunch to the guitars, but not too much... just a little. The layout is very consistent all around. Everything is done in shades of brownish green and cream, with some high contrast graphics over subtle cardboard looking textures. Inside the lyrics are arranged at haphazard angles over those same cardboard textures against jagged black space. I'm not into the lyrical content, though. They're pretty generic and a lot of the topics and lines use trendy metaphors and thematic issues such as the following: "I never noticed the color of your eyes until I saw them in the reflection of this knife, Green with envy for a life you never had, Bloodshot contempt when I extend my hand..." What it is with these bands always talking about knives and shit in reference to girls who've likely "wronged" them? Despite their strengths, I do think the tracks are too long (most over five minutes, some right at seven), but mainly because the CD runs 52 minutes, and that's just too much to take in one sitting... and I think I'd rather hear nine slightly shorter songs than seven or eight long songs. This band is definitely on the right track, because they're not totally generic (while not totally original) and they're competent writers, so with a bit more honing of their skills they could far outshine the competition. (6/10)"

AllMusic gave the album 4.5 stars out of 5:

"The Killing Tree are truly a marvelous formation of epic proportions, as while the members all hail from lesser-known hardcore acts such as Rise Against, Synnecrosis, Baxter, and Arma Angelus, they have somehow joined to create one of 2002's most stimulating hardcore releases. The Romance of Helen Trent is a volatile blend of melody, technical prowess, and blistering heavy metal crunch that somehow results in an outstanding yet original piece of art that excels at pelting the listener with unbridled emotion. "Prelude to Pain" lays its foundation in firm heavy metal song structures, yet squeezes in hardcore-like anthemic choruses and staggering breakdowns. The true beauty of The Romance of Helen Trent is that each and every song is given ample time to develop, while its lyrical stability propels it past the normal boundaries one expects from such a group. While many hardcore bands slip in an instrumental to serve as a relaxing moment in between cathartic odes to relationships and the scene, The Killing Tree put as much time and dedication to their instrumental "Soundtrack to a Failing Relationship," allowing the song to build through four-plus minutes of bliss. At times The Killing Tree recall At the Drive-In's fabulous avant-garde post-hardcore rock, yet manage to effectively place their trademark sound here and avoid becoming just another impersonation. It may come as a surprise, but these men somehow manage to allow each individual instrument to be recognizable and equally prominent, unusual for a hardcore scene which relies more on the noise made then the skill involved. Simply put, The Killing Tree have released an amazing album that never once loses its focus, and for those who enjoy the styles presented here, you'd be hard-pressed to find a better way to spend an hour."

Track listing

Personnel
 James Kaspar - lead vocals, rhythm guitar
 Todd Rundgren - lead guitar
 Jean-Luc Rue - bass, backing vocals
 Botchy Vasquez - drums

References

External links
The Killing Tree Website (Archived)
Aversionline.com Review

2002 debut albums
The Killing Tree albums